Eparchy of Debar and Kičevo (Епархија дебарско-кичевска) is an Eastern Orthodox eparchy (diocese) of the Orthodox Ohrid Archbishopric, an autonomous and canonical branch of the Serbian Orthodox Church in North Macedonia. Its historical seat is in the city of Debar. Since 2005, the eparchy is under administration of Bishop Joakim Jovčevski of Polog and Kumanovo.

History
From 1018 to 1283, Eparchy of Debar and neighboring region of Kičevo were under ecclesiastical jurisdiction of Eastern Orthodox Archbishopric of Ohrid. In 1107, archbishop Theophylact of Ohrid reported that bishop of Debar had to flee because of war between Byzantines and Normans that ended with the Treaty of Devol. In 1283, Byzantine rule ended. Territories of Debar and Kičevo were incorporated into the medieval Kingdom of Serbia and placed under the jurisdiction of Serbian Orthodox Church. In 1395–1396, entire region was conquered by Ottoman Turks, and subsequently placed again under the jurisdiction of Archbishopric of Ohrid. Under Ottoman rule, the region was organized as Sanjak of Debar.

In 1557, when Serbian Patriarchate of Peć was restored, Eparchy of Debar remained under ecclesiastical jurisdiction of Archbishops of Ohrid. After the suppression of Serbian Patriarchate (1766) and Archbishopric of Ohrid (1767), all of their eparchies came under direct jurisdiction of Ecumenical Patriarchate of Constantinople. Since then, Bishops of Dabar were appointed from Constantinople and they were granted the honorary title of Metropolitan.

In 1873, Eparchy of Debar was merged with Eparchy of Veles into Eparchy of Debar and Veles. In 1910, during the tenure of metropolitan Parthenios (1907-1913), Patriarchal Syond in Constantinople appointed Serbian Archimandrite Varnava Rosić (future Serbian Patriarch) as auxiliary bishop in the eparchy, with title "Bishop of Glavinica".

Ottoman rule ended in 1912, and the region was incorporated into Kingdom of Serbia. Metropolitan Parthenios left for Greece and bishop Varnava took over the administration of the eparchy. In 1920, entire region was officially transferred to the jurisdiction of the reunited Serbian Orthodox Church. At the same time, local eparchies were reorganized, and the Eparchy of Debar and Veles was divided, Veles and Kičevo being incorporated into Metropolitanate of Skopje, while the region of Debar was incorporated into the Eparchy of Ohrid which was later merged with the Eparchy of Bitola into the "Eparchy of Ohrid and Bitola" in 1931.

In 1959, Serbian Orthodox Church granted autonomy to eparchies in North Macedonia. After the failed negotiations and unilateral (and uncanonical) proclamation of autocephaly of Macedonian Orthodox Church in 1967, ecclesiastical order was disrupted. Since Republic of Macedonia proclaimed independence in 1992, Serbian Orthodox Church decided to place all eparchies in Macedonia under special administration. In 1993, auxiliary bishop Jovan Mladenović of Tetovo was appointed administrator of all eparchies in North Macedonia. Next year, he was transferred to another duty and administration was given to Bishop Pahomije Gačić of Vranje.

In 2005, reorganized Eparchy of Debar and Kičevo was placed under the administration of Joakim Jovčevski, Bishop of Polog and Kumanovo.

Bishops
Metropolitans of Debar and Veles (Δεβρών και Βελισσού) under jurisdiction of Ecumenical Patriarchate of Constantinople (1873-1920)

See also
 Orthodox Ohrid Archbishopric
 Archbishop Jovan VI of Ohrid
 Eparchy of Polog and Kumanovo
 List of eparchies of the Serbian Orthodox Church
 John of Debar

References

Sources

External links
 Bishopric of Debar and Kičevo
 Orthodox Ohrid Archbishopric: Decisions
 Serbian Orthodox Church

Orthodox Ohrid Archbishopric
Religious sees of the Serbian Orthodox Church